Mutavdžić is a Serbian surname. It may refer to: 

 Aleksandar Mutavdžić (born 1977), Serbian footballer
 Miljan Mutavdžić (born 1986), Serbian footballer

Around 70 people with the surname were killed during the Second World War in the Jasenovac concentration camp by Fascist Ustashe forces.

Serbian surnames

References